John Mill (by 1533 – 1562 or later) was an English politician.

He was a Member (MP) of the Parliament of England for Melcombe Regis in 1558.

References

Year of death missing
English MPs 1558
Members of the Parliament of England (pre-1707) for Melcombe Regis
Year of birth uncertain